Disonycha arizonae is a species of flea beetle in the family Chrysomelidae. It is found in Central America and North America.

Subspecies
These two subspecies belong to the species Disonycha arizonae:
 Disonycha arizonae arizonae
 Disonycha arizonae borealis Blake

References

Further reading

 
 

Alticini
Articles created by Qbugbot
Beetles described in 1884